The Nationalist was a newspaper published in Mobile, Alabama for African Americans during the Reconstruction era. It was established by missionaries and allied with the Republican Party. The Library of Congress has issues in its collection. It was published from late 1865 until about 1869. It was one of the most influential "Radical" newspapers in the South.

John Silsby (its early editor), Albert Griffin, Lawrence S. Berry, and John Carraway were leaders of the paper. There were internal disputes.over distribution and marketing strategies.

See also
Advertiser and Register

References

Newspapers published in Alabama
Publications established in 1865